Saint Louis Billikens soccer may refer to either of the soccer teams that represent the Saint Louis University:
Saint Louis Billikens men's soccer
Saint Louis Billikens women's soccer